The 2000 Guineas is a Group One set-weight Thoroughbred horse race for three-year-old horses run over a distance of 1600 metres at Riccarton Park in Christchurch, New Zealand.

Christchurch New Zealand cup week

The New Zealand 2000 Guineas is held on the Saturday following the Melbourne Cup, the first day of Christchurch's famous New Zealand Cup Week.

For thoroughbred horses the week also features:

 the Coupland's Bakeries Mile on the Wednesday
 the New Zealand 1000 Guineas for 3 year old fillies on the final Saturday
 the Stewards Handicap sprint
 the New Zealand Cup

Christchurch Cup week includes premier standardbred meetings at Addington raceway including:

 the New Zealand Trotting Cup for pacers on the Tuesday
 the New Zealand Free For All for pacers on the Friday
 the Dominion Handicap for trotters on the Friday

There is also greyhound racing on the Thursday, including the following Group 1 races:

 the New Zealand Galaxy - C5f 295m
 the New Zealand Greyhound Cup - C5f 520m
 the New Zealand Stayers Cup - C2df 732m

The week also features the Canterbury A&P Show

History

Until 1973, both the New Zealand Oaks and the New Zealand Derby were run at Riccarton. When those races were moved to Trentham Racecourse and Ellerslie Racecourse respectively, Riccarton was awarded two new classic races, the New Zealand 1000 Guineas and the New Zealand 2000 Guineas over 1600m. These races are based on the 1000 Guineas Stakes and 2000 Guineas Stakes, run at Newmarket in late April or early May.

Both races quickly established themselves on the New Zealand racing calendar.

Notable winners

Among the best recent winners of the 2000 Guineas are:
 Turn Me Loose, winner of the 2015 Crystal Mile, Seymour Cup & Emirates Stakes and 2016 Futurity Stakes.
 Jimmy Choux, winner of the 2011 New Zealand Derby, Rosehill Guineas, Windsor Park Plate and Spring Classic.
 Katie Lee, winner of the 2009 New Zealand 1000 Guineas.
 Darci Brahma, winner of the 2005 The T J Smith, Hawke's Bay Guineas & Otaki-Maori Weight for Age, 2007 Waikato Sprint & Telegraph Handicap.
 King's Chapel, winner of the 2004 Telegraph Handicap, Otaki-Maori Weight for Age & Gold Coast Guineas.
 Veandercross, winner of the 1992 Mackinnon Stakes & Canterbury Guineas and 1993 Queen Elizabeth Stakes, Ranvet Stakes & Australian Cup.
 Sacred Falls, winner of the 2013 and 2014 Doncaster Handicap and the 2014 George Main Stakes.

Jockey Opie Bosson has won the race a record eight times with:
 Danske (1998).
 Buzz Lightyear (1999).
 King's Chapel (2003).
 Katie Lee (2009).
 Atlante (2013).
 Turn Me Loose (2014).
 Embellish (2017).
 Noverre (2021).

Race results

See also
 Recent winners of major races for 3 year olds

References

Horse races in New Zealand
Flat horse races for three-year-olds